Stephen Joseph Malkmus (born May 30, 1966) is an American musician best known as the primary songwriter, lead singer and guitarist of the indie rock band Pavement. He currently performs with Stephen Malkmus and the Jicks and as a solo artist.

Biography

Early years
Stephen Malkmus was born in Santa Monica, California, to Mary and Stephen Malkmus Sr. His father was a property and casualty insurance agent. When Stephen Jr. was 8, the family moved north to Stockton, where he attended Carpinteria's Cate School and Lodi's Tokay High School. As a teenager, Malkmus worked various jobs, including painting house numbers on street curbs and "flipping burgers or whatever" at a country club. At age 16, he spent the night in jail after consuming alcohol, urinating in the bushes, and walking on the roofs of several residential homes. Later, he was placed on probation for underage drinking, and was also expelled from school "for going to a party in the woods where people were taking mushrooms. I didn’t take them, but some guy narc’d on me."

Malkmus learned the guitar by playing along to Jimi Hendrix's recording of "Purple Haze". Around the age of 16, he started playing in several Stockton-based punk bands: Bag O Bones, The Straw Dogs, and Crisis Alert. After graduating from high school, Malkmus followed in his father's footsteps by attending the University of Virginia, where he majored in history and was a disc jockey for the college radio station WTJU. During this time, Malkmus met fellow WTJU DJs David Berman (who would later front the Silver Jews) and James McNew (of Yo La Tengo) and formed the lo-fi band Ectoslavia. In the late 1980s, he was employed as a security guard at the Whitney Museum of American Art in New York City, along with Berman and Bob Nastanovich.

Career

Pavement

Malkmus formed Pavement with Scott Kannberg (aka Spiral Stairs) while he was living in Stockton during the 1980s. Their first album, Slanted & Enchanted, was released to critical acclaim, and the band continued to receive attention for subsequent releases. Pavement, and Malkmus in particular, were hailed as spearheading the underground indie movement of the 1990s.

Pavement reunited in 2010 and embarked on a world tour, and reunited again in 2022 and 2023 for another tour.

Solo work and The Jicks
In 2001, following the 1999 dissolution of Pavement, Malkmus released his first self-titled album with his new band, The Jicks (although they were uncredited).

On May 23, 2003 in Milwaukee, while touring with his new band The Jicks, Malkmus opened the show by saying, "This is off our first record." The band then notably proceeded to play an evening's worth of Pavement songs, marking the third time Malkmus had played any of his previous band's songs since their 1999 breakup; the first was in January 2002 in Seoul, South Korea.

Malkmus's fourth studio album with The Jicks, Real Emotional Trash, was released in March 2008.

In August 2011 he released his fifth studio album with The Jicks, Mirror Traffic.
He played the album Ege Bamyasi, originally by the band Can, in its entirety on December 1, 2012 at WEEK-END Festival in Cologne, Germany. A recording of this performance was released as a limited-edition live album on Record Store Day 2013.

Malkmus's sixth studio album with the Jicks, Wig Out at Jagbags, was released on January 7, 2014. On February 7, 2018, Stephen Malkmus and the Jicks released "Middle America", their first material in four years. It was their first single from their seventh studio album, Sparkle Hard, which was released on May 18, 2018.

Malkmus released an electronic album titled Groove Denied on March 15, 2019, after having worked on the album for 12 to 13 years. After he submitted the album in 2017, Matador's president and founder Chris Lombardi, who has been releasing Malkmus' records since Pavement's 1992 debut Slanted and Enchanted, flew personally to Portland to inform Malkmus that it wasn't the right time to release the album. The album features Malkmus on all instruments and production and engineering.  Malkmus released Traditional Techniques on March 6, 2020. The album was produced by Chris Funk of The Decemberists and features guitarist Matt Sweeney and musician Qais Essar.

Side projects
Malkmus also was a member of rock group Silver Jews along with poet/lyricist David Berman. In early 1999 Stephen Malkmus participated in a Sonic Youth side project called Kim's Bedroom that included bassist/vocalist Kim Gordon, guitarist/vocalist Thurston Moore, Chicago avant-garde veteran Jim O'Rourke, and renowned Japanese drummer Ikue Mori; they never released an album, but did play a few live shows. By 2001 he was performing as frontman of The Jicks.

In 2007, Malkmus provided 3 songs to the Todd Haynes' film I'm Not There, based on the life of Bob Dylan. He contributed on the songs "Ballad of a Thin Man", "Can't Leave Her Behind" and "Maggie's Farm". Malkmus has admitted that he was never "really a really big fan of Dylan," but noted that his involvement with the film had made him listen "to him again a little closer."

In 2016, Malkmus scored the soundtrack to the Netflix series Flaked, which stars Arrested Development'''s Will Arnett.

Personal life
Malkmus moved to Portland, Oregon, where he met his wife, artist Jessica Jackson Hutchins. The couple have two children: daughters Lottie (born 2004) and Sunday (born 2007). In 2011, before the release of Mirror Traffic, Malkmus and his family moved to Berlin. By the release of Wig Out at Jagbags in 2014, however, the family had moved back to Portland.

Malkmus is a sports fan, supports Hull City Football Club and is known to play golf and tennis;  he also played second base for the Portland-based Disjecta softball team. Malkmus also previously played lacrosse in his high school.

Equipment

Malkmus currently plays a Fender Stratocaster and a Guild S-100. Other guitars used are a 1960s Fender Jazzmaster that can be traced back to the Brighten The Corners era, a Gibson Les Paul Deluxe, and a Fender Stratocaster that was his guitar of choice during the majority of his time with Pavement. He used a Gibson SG with Pavement during the Crooked Rain, Crooked Rain era. For the 2010 Pavement reunion tour he used his Stratocaster extensively. During his 2011 tour in support of Mirror Traffic he played a Guild S-100. He has also played a Danelectro Silvertone (Sears model dating to 1962 or 1963) for one-off solo shows.

Typically, he uses an Orange Retro 50 head through a 1970s Marshall 4x12 cabinet when playing live, though he has used various other Orange, Marshall and Fender amps, including a vintage Silverface Twin Reverb during the early Pavement years, an Orange OR120 during later Pavement years, and a single channel Orange AD30 with the Jicks. Malkmus's other confirmed (though not constant) gear includes: Z.Vex Fuzz Factory, Diamond J-Drive, Line 6 DL4 Delay Modeler, T-Rex Replica, Lovetone Big Cheese, Lovetone Meatball, BOSS TU-2, DigiTech Whammy, Crowther HotCake, Kaisser Instruments Reamer and Pro Co RAT.

Discography

With Pavement

 Slanted and Enchanted (1992)
 Crooked Rain, Crooked Rain (1994)
 Wowee Zowee (1995)
 Brighten the Corners (1997)
 Terror Twilight (1999)

With Silver Jews

Singles and EPs
 Dime Map of the Reef (1992 – 7"ep)
 The Sabellion Rebellion & Old New York (1993 – 7")
 The Arizona Record (1993 – 12")
 Hot as Hell – Live 1993 (1999 – 7" Single)

Albums
 Starlite Walker (1994)
 American Water (1998)
 Tanglewood Numbers (2005)
 Lookout Mountain, Lookout Sea (2008)

With The Crust Brothers
 Marquee Mark  (1998)

With The Jicks

Albums
 Stephen Malkmus (2001)
 Pig Lib (2003)
 Face the Truth (2005)
 Real Emotional Trash (2008)
 Mirror Traffic (2011)
 Wig Out at Jagbags (2014)
 Sparkle Hard (2018)

Solo albums
 Groove Denied (2019)
 Traditional Techniques (2020)

Singles
 "Discretion Grove" (2001) – w/ "Sin Taxi" and "Leisurely Poison" (2001)
 "Jenny & the Ess-Dog" (2001) – w/ "Keep the Faith", "That's What Mama Said" and "Alien Boy"
 Phantasies EP (2001) – w/ "Malay Massaker"
 "Jo Jo's Jacket" – w/ "Polish Mule", "The Hook (live)" and "Open and Shut Cases" (2001)
 "Sex Life of Robinson Crusoe, Pt. 2" (2001) – B-side available only on official site
 "Us" (2003)
 "Dark Wave" (2003) – w/ Pig Lib bonus disc B-sides
 "Post-Paint Boy" (2005)
 "Baby C'Mon" (2005) – w/ "Wow Ass Jeans"
 Kindling for the Master EP (2006) – w/ 4 remixes
 "Cold Son" 10" EP (2008) – w/ "Walk Into the Mirror", "Pennywhistle Thunder" and "Carl the Clod"
 "Gardenia" (2008) – w/ "Walk Into the Mirror"
 "Middle America" (2018)
 "Shiggy" (2018)
 "Refute" (2018)
 "Viktor Borgia" (2019)
 "Rushing the Acid Frat" (2019)
 "Come Get Me" (2019)

Compilations and collaborations
 SubUrbia Original Motion Picture Soundtrack (1997) – "Unheard Music" (with Elastica)
 At Home With the Groovebox (2000) – "Robyn Turns 26"
 All Tomorrow's Parties 1.1 (2002) – "Good Kids Eggs"
 Colonel Jeffrey Pumpernicklel (2002) – "Blue Rash Intact (Quarantined-Hallucinations Due To Severe Allergies)"
 Under the Influence – 21 years of Flying Nun Records (2002) – "Death and the Maiden"
 Matador At Fifteen (2004) – "It Kills (live)"
 This One's for the Fellows: A Sonic Salute to the Young Fresh Fellows (2004) – guitar on "No One Really Knows" (with The Maroons)
 Chokes! EP by Silkworm (2007) – guitar on "Spanish Harlem Incident (live)"
 I'm Not There (Music from the Motion Picture) (2007) – With [The Million Dollar Bashers]: "Ballad of a Thin Man" and "Maggie's Farm"; with Lee Ranaldo: "Can't Leave Her Behind" and "What Kind of Friend is This?" (iTunes only)
 Early Risers by Soldiers of Fortune (2015) – "Campus Swagger"
 Day of the Dead (2016) – "China Cat Sunflower -> I Know You Rider"
 Battle Hymns (2017) – "Midnight Cruisers" Digital Download http://www.quasiband.com/
●  Fiddle player in the 2019 film "First Cow" 

Miscellaneous
 The New Yorker College Tour: University of Washington, Seattle: A Conversation with Stephen Malkmus'' (2006)

Music videos

 Cover of "Death And The Maiden" by New Zealand band 'The Verlaines'. Available on Flying Num DVD 'Very Short Films'.

Notes

References

External links
Official site
Matador Records US record label
Domino Records UK record label
It's a Brand New Era fan site

1966 births
Living people
American male singers
American rock singers
American rock guitarists
American male guitarists
Songwriters from California
American indie rock musicians
Musicians from Santa Monica, California
Musicians from Charlottesville, Virginia
University of Virginia alumni
Musicians from Stockton, California
Musicians from Portland, Oregon
Singers from Oregon
Musicians from Berlin
Pavement (band) members
Drag City (record label) artists
Songwriters from Virginia
Songwriters from Oregon
Guitarists from California
Guitarists from Virginia
Guitarists from Oregon
Stephen Malkmus and the Jicks members
20th-century American guitarists
Silver Jews members
20th-century American male musicians
American male songwriters